Mohammad Nawaz (born 10 September 1970) is a former Pakistani first-class cricketer who played for Sargodha and Faisalabad cricket teams. He played 154 First-class and 69 List A cricket matches.

References

External links
 

1970 births
Living people
Pakistani cricketers
Cricketers from Sargodha
Sargodha cricketers
Faisalabad cricketers
Allied Bank Limited cricketers